Atiqur Rahman Meshu (born 26 August 1988) is a retired Bangladeshi footballer who last played as a defender for Brothers Union in the Bangladesh Premier League. He is also a former member of the Bangladesh Premier League. Meshu is a versatile player who played as left back, right back, center back and also as a defensive midfielder, throughout his career which lasted for more than a decade. 

Meshu currently is an assistant coach for Fortis FC in the Bangladesh Championship League.

References

Living people
1988 births
People from Kishoreganj District
Bangladeshi footballers
Bangladesh international footballers
Association football central defenders
Footballers at the 2010 Asian Games
Asian Games competitors for Bangladesh
Brothers Union players
South Asian Games gold medalists for Bangladesh
South Asian Games medalists in football